WCOW-FM (97.1 FM, "Cow 97") is a country music radio station licensed to Sparta, Wisconsin that serves Mid-western Wisconsin and the La Crosse and La Crescent communities on the nearby Mississippi River separating Minnesota and Wisconsin. WCOW-FM also simulcasted for many years on their sister station at 1290 AM when it too had the WCOW calls. The WCOW call sign has previously been used by other broadcasters, including a station that existed from 1951 to 1957 in Minneapolis-St. Paul before being renamed as WISK.

References

External links

COW-FM
Country radio stations in the United States